Matías Augusto Pérez García (born 13 October 1984) is an Argentine professional football midfielder who currently plays for Deportivo Municipal in the Peruvian Primera División.

Career
Pérez García began his playing career in 2002 with Lanús of the Argentine Primera División. He then played a number of seasons in the Argentine 2nd division with C.A.I. and Talleres de Remedios de Escalada. In 2007, he was signed by Uruguayan club C.A. Cerro and loaned out to Atlanta and then Chamois Niortais. In 2011, he signed for the Chilean club Universidad de Chile of the Chilean Primera División. After the 2011 Apertura he returned on loan to All Boys, after play only 7 games in the Tournament.

San Jose Earthquakes
Pérez García signed for Major League Soccer side San Jose Earthquakes on 31 July 2014. He debuted for San Jose on 8 August 2014 against LA Galaxy, where he scored his first goal of his MLS career.

Orlando City
Pérez García was traded to Orlando City on August 3, 2016 in exchange for midfielder Darwin Cerén. He was waived by Orlando on 28 June 2017.

Tigre
After being released by Orlando City in June 2017, Pérez García signed with Tigre on July 18, 2017.

Honours
Universidad de Chile
 Primera División de Chile: 2011 Apertura

References

External links
 
 
 Perez signed by San Jose
 

1984 births
Living people
Sportspeople from Salta Province
Argentine footballers
Argentine expatriate footballers
Argentina youth international footballers
Argentina under-20 international footballers
Association football midfielders
Designated Players (MLS)
Club Atlético Lanús footballers
Comisión de Actividades Infantiles footballers
Talleres de Remedios de Escalada footballers
Club Atlético Atlanta footballers
C.A. Cerro players
All Boys footballers
Chamois Niortais F.C. players
Universidad de Chile footballers
San Jose Earthquakes players
Orlando City SC players
Club Atlético Tigre footballers
Cúcuta Deportivo footballers
Club de Gimnasia y Esgrima La Plata footballers
Deportivo Municipal footballers
Argentine Primera División players
Peruvian Primera División players
Major League Soccer players
Categoría Primera A players
Argentine expatriate sportspeople in the United States
Expatriate soccer players in the United States
Expatriate footballers in Chile
Expatriate footballers in Uruguay
Expatriate footballers in France